La Ronde is a 1950 French film directed by Max Ophüls and based on Arthur Schnitzler's 1897 play La Ronde.

Set in Vienna in 1900, it shows ten amorous encounters across the social spectrum, from a street prostitute to a nobleman, with each scene involving one character from the previous episode. The French term 'La Ronde' can mean any of the following: circling around, doing the rounds, a round of drinks, a circular dance.

The film won the BAFTA award for Best Film and was nominated for two Academy Awards; for Best Writing and Best Art Direction.

Plot
The master of ceremonies opens proceedings by telling the audience that they will see various episodes in the endless waltz of love. A prostitute takes a soldier under a bridge. The soldier picks up a chambermaid at a dance hall. The chambermaid willingly succumbs to the son of her employers. The young man starts an affair with the young wife of an older businessman. She then has an edgy discussion in bed with her husband. The husband takes a shopgirl to a private dining room and gets her drunk. The shopgirl falls for a poet, who is pursuing an affair with an actress. The actress invites a count to visit her in bed next morning. That evening, he gets drunk and ends up in the bed of the prostitute, so completing the circle.

Cast
In order of appearance:
 Anton Walbrook as the Master of Ceremonies
 Simone Signoret as Léocadie, the Prostitute
 Serge Reggiani as Franz, the Soldier
 Simone Simon as Marie, the Chambermaid
 Daniel Gélin as Alfred, the Young Master
 Danielle Darrieux as Emma, the Wife
 Fernand Gravey as Charles, the Husband
 Odette Joyeux as Anna, the Shopgirl
 Jean-Louis Barrault as Robert, the Poet
 Isa Miranda as Charlotte, the Actress
 Gérard Philipe as the Count

Production
Although at the time of production, Schnitzler's son was still enforcing his father's stipulation that the play — Reigen (or La Ronde) — should never be performed or adapted, Ophuls was able to secure the rights to it because of Schnitzler's additional stipulation that his French-language translator was to own the rights to the French version.

Censorship
The film was classified by New York film censors as "immoral" and therefore unacceptable for public screenings. At the end of 1953, the film's producers appealed to the U.S. Supreme Court and, in 1954, La Ronde was approved for exhibition in New York without any cuts.

Reception

Critical response 
On Rotten Tomatoes, the film holds an approval rating of 100% based on 15 reviews, with an average rating of 8.21/10.

See also
 La Ronde, a film made in 1964, directed by Roger Vadim, based on the same play

References

External links
 
 
 
 La ronde: Vicious Circle an essay by Terrence Rafferty at the Criterion Collection

1950 films
1950 drama films
Adultery in films
French anthology films
Films about prostitution in Austria
French films based on plays
Films based on works by Arthur Schnitzler
Films directed by Max Ophüls
Films set in the 1890s
Films set in Vienna
French drama films
French romantic comedy films
Best Film BAFTA Award winners
Films scored by Oscar Straus
French black-and-white films
1950s French films